72nd Brigade is one of two Infantry brigades of Slovenian Armed Forces; the other one is 1st Brigade.

History

Organization 
 July 2002
 Command
 122nd Infantry Training Battalion
 172nd Infantry Training Battalion
 74th Armoured-Mechanized Battalion
 76th Anti-Tank Battalion
 760th Artillery Battalion
 670th Logistical Base

 May 2004
 Command
 Command-Logistical Company
 122nd Infantry Training Battalion
 172nd Infantry Training Battalion
 132nd Mountain Battalion
 74th Armoured-Mechanized Battalion
 45th Armoured Battalion
 460th Artillery Battalion
 760th Artillery Battalion
 18th Nuclear, Biological, Chemical Defense Battalion
 76th Anti-Tank Battalion
 670th Logistical Base

 July 2004
 Command
 Command-Logistical Company
 132nd Mountain Battalion
 74th Armoured-Mechanized Battalion
 45th Armoured Battalion
 460th Artillery Battalion
 76th Anti-Tank Battalion
 18th Nuclear, Biological, Chemical Defense Battalion
 14th Engineer Battalion

 March 2008
 Command
 Command-Logistical Company
 132nd Mountain Battalion
 45th Armoured Battalion
 460th Artillery Battalion
 18th Nuclear, Biological, Chemical Defense Battalion
 14th Engineer Battalion

 June 2013
 Command
 20th Infantry Regiment
 74th Infantry Regiment
 Territorial Regiment
 Combat Support Battalion
 Light Rocket Air Defense Battery
 Engineer Company
 Nuclear, Biological, Chemical Defense Company
 Signals Company
 Military Police Company
 Intelligence and Reconnaissance Company
 Fire Support Battery (Artillery)
 Anti-Tank Company

References

See also 
 List of units of Slovenian Armed Forces

Brigades of Slovenia
Maribor
Military units and formations established in 1992